The Cash–Landrum Incident was an unidentified flying object sighting in the United States in 1980, which witnesses claimed was responsible for causing health and property damage. Uncharacteristically for such UFO reports, this resulted in civil court proceedings, though the case ended in a dismissal.

A number of skeptic investigators, including Philip J. Klass, Peter Brookesmith, Steuart Campbell, and Brian Dunning, questioned the details and overall authenticity of the incident.

Incident report

Description of encounter 
On the evening of December 29, 1980, Betty Cash, Vickie Landrum, and Vickie's seven-year-old grandson Colby Landrum were driving home to Dayton, Texas in Cash's Oldsmobile Cutlass after dining out.

A few minutes later on the winding roads, they saw what they believed to be the same light as before, but thought it was now much closer and brighter. They said that it came from a huge diamond-shaped object, which hovered at about treetop level, and that its base was expelling flame and emitting significant heat.

Landrum told Cash to stop the car, fearing they would be burned if they got closer. A born again Christian, she interpreted the object as a sign of the Second Coming of Jesus Christ, telling Colby, "That's Jesus. He will not hurt us."

Cash said she was anxious, and considered turning the car around, but abandoned this idea, because the road was too narrow and she presumed the car would get stuck on the dirt shoulders, which were soft from that evening's rains.

Cash and Landrum said that they got out of the car to examine the object, but that Colby was terrified, and so Landrum said she quickly returned to the car to comfort him. Cash remained outside, "mesmerized by the bizarre sight", as Jerome Clark wrote. He went on: "The object, intensely bright and a dull metallic silver, was shaped like a huge upright diamond, about the size of the Dayton water tower, with its top and bottom cut off so that they were flat rather than pointed. Small blue lights ringed the center, and periodically over the next few minutes flames shot out of the bottom, flaring outward, creating the effect of a large cone. Every time the fire dissipated, the UFO floated a few feet downwards toward the road. But when the flames blasted out again, the object rose about the same distance."

They said the heat was strong enough to make the car's metal body painful to the touch. Cash said she had to use her coat to protect her hand from being burned by the door handle when she finally got back in the car. When she touched the dashboard, Landrum claimed her hand pressed into the softened vinyl, leaving an imprint that was evident weeks later. Investigators cited it as proof of their account; however, no photograph of it exists.

They said that the object then ascended over the treetops, and rose higher in the sky, and then a group of helicopters approached it, surrounding it in tight formation. Cash and Landrum counted 23 helicopters, and later identified some of them as tandem-rotor Boeing CH-47 Chinooks used by military forces worldwide.

With the road now clear, Cash says she drove on, claiming to see glimpses of the object and the helicopters receding into the distance.

From first sighting the object to its departure, they said the encounter lasted about 20 minutes. Based on descriptions given in John F. Schuessler's book about the incident, it appears that they were southbound on Texas state highway FM 1485/2100 when they claimed to have seen the object.

Health problem claims 
The witnesses claimed that after the UFO and helicopters left, Cash took the Landrums home, then retired for the evening. That night, they reportedly all experienced similar symptoms, though Cash to a greater degree. The claim was that they suffered from nausea, vomiting, diarrhea, generalized weakness, a burning sensation in their eyes, and feeling as though they were suffering from sunburn.

Over the next few days, Cash said her symptoms worsened, with many large, painful blisters forming on her skin. When taken to a hospital emergency room on January 3, 1981, Clark writes, Cash "could not walk, and had lost large patches of skin and clumps of hair. She was released after 12 days, though her condition was not much better, and she later returned to the hospital for another 15 days." (Clark, 176) In a 1985 HBO documentary, "UFOs: What's Going On", Cash claimed she was treated for cancer after being exposed to the "radioactive UFO".

The Landrums' health was somewhat better, though reportedly both suffered from lingering weakness, skin sores and hair loss.

Cash later developed breast cancer and Landrum severe cataracts.

A radiologist who examined the witnesses' medical records for MUFON wrote, "We have strong evidence that these patients have suffered secondary damage to ionizing radiation. It is also possible that there was an infrared component as well." (quoted in Clark, 176)

However, Brad Sparks contends that, although the symptoms were somewhat similar to those caused by ionizing radiation, the rapidity of onset was only consistent with a massive dose that would have meant certain death in a few days. Since all of the victims lived for years after the incident, Sparks suggests the cause of the symptoms was some kind of chemical contamination, presumably by an aerosol.

Other claims 

Investigators later located a Dayton police officer, Detective Lamar Walker, and his wife who claimed to have seen 12 Chinook-type helicopters near the same area in which the Cash–Landrum event allegedly occurred and at roughly the same time. These other witnesses did not report seeing a large diamond-shaped object.

One day in April 1981, a CH-47 helicopter flew into Dayton. As Colby watched, he became very upset. Landrum decided to take him to the spot where the helicopter had landed with the hope that it would seem less frightening on the ground. When they reached the landing zone, they found a lot of people there already and had to wait some time before they were allowed to go inside the helicopter and talk to the pilot. Landrum and another visitor both claimed that the pilot said he had been in the area before for the purpose of checking on a UFO in trouble near Huffman. When Landrum told the pilot how glad she was to see him, because she had been one of the people burned by the UFO, he refused to talk to them further and hustled them out of the aircraft.

Aftermath

Legal action 
Eventually, Cash and Landrum contacted their U.S. Senators, Lloyd Bentsen and John Tower, who suggested that the witnesses file a complaint with the Judge Advocate Claims office at Bergstrom Air Force Base. In August 1981, Cash, Landrum, and Colby were interviewed at length by personnel at Bergstrom Air Force Base, and were told that they should hire a lawyer, and seek financial compensation for their injuries.

With attorney Peter Gersten taking on the case pro bono, the case wound its way through the U.S. courts for several years. Cash and Landrum sued the U.S. federal government for $20 million. Testimony of officials from NASA, the Air Force, and the Army and Navy was given.

On August 21, 1986, a U.S. District Court judge dismissed their case, noting that the plaintiffs had not proved that the helicopters were associated with the U.S. federal government, and that military officials had testified that the United States Armed Forces did not have a large, diamond-shaped aircraft in their possession. As no governmental agency possessed an aircraft resembling the UFO, the case was dismissed.

Media coverage 
The incident received coverage in both the tabloid press and mainstream media:
 In 1981, Landrum appeared on That's Incredible!, a popular ABC television program. She was hypnotized in front of a studio audience; under hypnosis she recounted the UFO incident.
 Landrum and Cash both appeared on the 1989 U.S television special, UFO Cover Up? Live!, hosted by Mike Farrell, where they related their account of the purported UFO encounter, and their subsequent medical problems and legal battles.
 The Cash–Landrum event was also depicted on the television programs Unsolved Mysteries and Sightings.
 In 2009, Colby appeared on UFO Hunters: Alien Fallout.

Deaths of Cash and Landrum 
Cash died on December 29, 1998, 18 years after her claimed close encounter.

Landrum died September 12, 2007.

Investigations 
Landrum telephoned a number of U.S. government agencies and officials about the encounter. When she telephoned NASA, she was steered toward NASA aerospace engineer John Schuessler, long interested in UFOs. With some associates from civilian UFO research group Mutual UFO Network (MUFON), Schuessler began research on the case, and later wrote articles and a book on the subject. Astronomer Allan Hendry of Center for UFO Studies (CUFOS) also briefly investigated the Cash–Landrum case.

Due to the Chinook helicopters' presence, the witnesses presumed that at least one branch of the United States Armed Forces witnessed the object, if they were not escorting or pursuing it. However, investigators could find no evidence linking the helicopters with any branch of the military.

In 1982, Lt. Col. George Sarran of the Department of the Army Inspector General began the only thorough formal governmental investigation into the supposed UFO encounter. He could not find any evidence that the helicopters the witnesses claimed to have seen belonged to the U.S. Armed Forces. Sarran stated that "Ms. Landrum and Ms. Cash were credible ... the policeman and his wife [who claimed to have seen 12 helicopters near the UFO encounter site] were also credible witnesses. There was no perception that anyone was trying to exaggerate the truth." (quoted in Clark, 177)

In 1998, journalist and UFO skeptic Philip J. Klass, found a few reasons to doubt the story by Cash and Landrum:

In 1994, UFO skeptic Steuart Campbell suggested that the witnesses may have observed a mirage of Canopus, which lay exactly in line with the road, although it was 26° below the horizon at that time and location.

Other UFO researchers point out that high-energy ionizing radiation of the kind that can cause damage to human beings, such as gamma radiation, does not induce radioactivity in objects and would not have left behind any residual radioactivity in the area.

Similarly, skeptical British ufologist Peter Brookesmith writes, "Sceptics have always asked a blunt and fundamental question: What was the trio's state of health before their alleged encounter?" Brookesmith also wrote: "To ufologists, the case is perhaps the most baffling and frustrating of modern times, for what started with solid evidence for a notoriously elusive phenomenon petered out in a maze of dead ends, denials, and perhaps even official deviousness."

In December 2018, Brian Dunning investigated the case and reported his findings on the Skeptoid podcast. He found that Cash's doctor's notes attribute her hair loss to the autoimmune disease alopecia areata, that her other symptoms could be caused by illness that started before the incident, and that Landrum's only documented illness is developing cataract in one eye. Dunning concludes:

According to Texas Monthly, "To this day, there is no conclusive explanation of the night’s events."

See also 
 List of reported UFO sightings
 Unidentified flying object

References

Further reading 
 Clark, Jerome, The UFO Encyclopedia: The Phenomenon from the Beginning, Volume 1: A–K (second edition); Detroit: Omnigraphics, 1998; 
 Corpus Christi Caller – Texas Scripps Newspapers, L.P. A Scripps Howard newspaper.

External links 
 Transcript of Bergstrom AFB Interview of Betty Cash, Vickie and Colby Landrum August 1981 (part 1 of 2)
 Transcript of Bergstrom AFB Interview of Betty Cash, Vickie and Colby Landrum August 1981 (part 2 of 2)
 Close Encounters of the Lone Star Kind, 1980: Dayton, Texas by Pamela Colloff, from Texas Monthly
 The Piney Woods Incident – Cash–Landrum UFO Case
 Texas UFO Encounters – Dayton, (Piney Woods) Texas
 
 August 29th, 2012 Radio Interview with John F. Schuessler, Former MUFON International Director (2000–2006)

UFO sightings in the United States
1980 in Texas
December 1980 events in the United States